The Church of the Blessed Sacrament is a Roman Catholic parish church in the Roman Catholic Archdiocese of New York, located in the Upper West Side of Manhattan at 152 West 71st Street, just east of Broadway. The parish was established in 1887.

The present church was started in 1914 to designs by Gustave E. Steinback and the first mass was held on Christmas 1920.

The Arclight Theatre is located on the lower level.

External links

References 

Gothic Revival church buildings in New York City
Religious organizations established in 1887
Roman Catholic churches in Manhattan
Roman Catholic churches completed in 1920
Gustave E. Steinback church buildings
Upper West Side
1887 establishments in New York (state)
20th-century Roman Catholic church buildings in the United States